Tormé were a band featuring Irish guitarist Bernie Tormé, whom the band was named after. Tormé's singer was Phil Lewis, who had previously been in the bands Girl and New Torpedos, and who is now in L.A. Guns. The band also featured bassist Chris Heilmann, who later played for Shark Island, and drummer Ian Whitewood.

Tormé recorded the albums Back To Babylon and Die Pretty, Die Young.

Tormé recorded a song titled "Sex Action" on their album Die Pretty, Die Young, but it is not the same song that L.A. Guns later recorded on their self-titled album.

A later line-up of Bernie Tormé, Chris Jones, John Pearce (JJ Kaos) and Gary Owen recorded the album Demolition Ball for the Bleeding Hearts label in 1993.

Discography
 Back To Babylon (1986)
 Die Pretty, Die Young (1987)
 Demolition Ball (1993)

References

English glam metal musical groups